The  is a commuter electric multiple unit (EMU) train type operated by the private railway operator Tokyu Corporation on the Tokyu Den-en-toshi Line and Tokyu Oimachi Line in the Tokyo area of Japan since from 1975 until 2023, and the Jabodetabek area of Indonesia since 2006.

Design
Based on the design of the earlier 8000 series, the 8500 series was introduced as the sixth batch of the 8000 series fleet, featuring some differences over the preceding batches. Among these include a raised driver's cab position, automatic train control (ATC), and air conditioning.

History 
The 8500 series was a recipient of the 1976 Laurel Prize. Early examples of the 8500 series were initially delivered as four-car sets; however, they were ultimately lengthened to ten-car sets. A total of 400 vehicles were built by 1991.

When the Teito Rapid Transit Authority (TRTA) Hanzomon Line opened in 1978, Tokyu leased three 6-car 8500 series trains to the agency for approximately a decade, as they did not yet possess their own trains for the line.

Following the introduction of newer Tokyu 5000 series trainsets in 2002, the 8500 series fleet was gradually withdrawn from Den-en-toshi Line services.

To allow for an increase in rolling stock for then-upcoming Tokyu Toyoko Line and Tokyo Metro Fukutoshin Line inter-running services, Tokyu suspended 8500 series withdrawals in 2009. However, withdrawals resumed following the introduction of newer 2020 series trainsets in 2018. On 5 April 2022, Tokyu announced that the 8500 series would end regular service in January 2023. The two remaining sets at the time of the announcement, sets 8631 and 8637, were withdrawn on 25 May 2022 and 25 January 2023, respectively.

Operations
Five-car sets were used on Tokyu Oimachi Line services until April 2019.

Formations

Den-en-toshi Line 10-car sets
Den-en-toshi Line 10-car sets, based at Nagatsuta Depot, were formed as shown below with eight motored ("M") cars and two non-powered trailer ("T") cars, and car 1 at the Shibuya end.

 Cars 2, 5, 7, and 10 were each fitted with one lozenge-type pantograph.
 Cars 3 and 9 had a wheelchair space.
 Car 2 was designated as a mildly air-conditioned car.

Den-en-toshi Line sets 8601 to 8614 were marked with "K" stickers on the center front window of the driving cab ends, and they were restricted to operating on Den-en-toshi Line and Tokyo Metro Hanzōmon Line only, due to lack of Tobu ATS on these sets. After the opening of the Hanzōmon Line extension from Suitengūmae Station to Oshiage Station, sets 8601, 8602, 8613, and 8614 were fitted with Tobu ATS, allowing them to operate on Tobu Skytree Line, Tobu Isesaki Line and Tobu Nikko Line (and had their "K" stickers removed), while sets 8603 to 8612 were retained without Tobu ATS until their retirement from duties on the Den-en-toshi Line.

All trains with "K" stickers have had their ATS system installed or withdrawn from service. The last train with the K sticker, set 8606, was retired in May 2020.

Oimachi Line 5-car sets

Oimachi Line five-car sets, based at Nagatsuta Depot, were formed as shown below with four motored ("M") cars and one non-powered trailer ("T") car, and car 1 at the Oimachi end. These sets were withdrawn from service by April 2019.

 Cars 2 and 5 were each fitted with one single-arm pantograph.
 Car 2 was designated as a mildly air-conditioned car.

Interior

Livery variations

Resale
A number of 8500 series trains have been resold to other operators in Japan and overseas following their withdrawal from Tokyu services.

Nagano Electric Railway

Six 3-car sets were sold to the Nagano Electric Railway between 2005 and 2009. These retain the "8500 series" classification.

Formation
 DeHa 8500 (M1c)
 SaHa 8550 (T)
 DeHa 8510 (M2c)

Izukyu Corporation
One 8500 series car (DeHa 8723) was sold to Izukyu Corporation in 2006, becoming KuMoHa 8152, and combined with former Tokyu 8000 series cars. It includes transverse seating acquired from Seibu 10000 series trains during refurbishment.

Chichibu Railway

Two 3-car 7000 series sets were formed from cars of set 8609, entering service on the Chichibu Railway in 2009.

Indonesia
Eight 8-car sets (8604, 8607*, 8608*, 8610, 8611*, 8612*, 8613*, and 8618) were sold to KRL Jabodetabek in Indonesia between 2006 and 2009 for use on commuter services in the Jakarta area. The sets initially received different color schemes, but were later standardized with the same KA Commuter Jabodetabek red and yellow livery. Set 8618 is the first to be repainted in KAI Commuter paint scheme in February 2021. Set 8612 was retired due to an accident in 2019.

References

Electric multiple units of Japan
8500
Electric multiple units of Indonesia
Train-related introductions in 1975
Tokyu Car multiple units
1500 V DC multiple units of Japan